4-H is a U.S.-based network of youth organizations whose mission is "engaging youth to reach their fullest potential while advancing the field of youth development". Its name is a reference to the occurrence of the initial letter H four times in the organization's original motto "head, heart, hands, and health", which was later incorporated into the fuller pledge officially adopted in 1927. In the United States, the organization is administered by the National Institute of Food and Agriculture of the United States Department of Agriculture (USDA). 4-H Canada is an independent non-profit organization overseeing the operation of branches throughout Canada. There are 4-H organizations in over 50 countries; the organization and administration varies from country to country.

The goal of 4-H is to develop citizenship, leadership, responsibility and life skills of youth through experiential learning programs and a positive youth development approach. Though typically thought of as an agriculturally focused organization as a result of its history, 4-H today focuses on citizenship, healthy living, science, engineering, and technology programs. Clubs in today's 4-H world consist of a wide range of options each allowing for personal growth and career success. The 4-H motto is "To make the best better", while its slogan is "Learn by doing" (sometimes written as "Learn to do by doing"). As of 2016, the organization had nearly 6 million active participants and more than 25 million alumni.

History

The foundations of 4-H began in 1902 with the work of several people in different parts of the United States. The focal point of 4-H has been the idea of practical and hands-on learning, which came from the desire to make public school education more connected to rural life. Early programs incorporated  both public and private resources. 4-H was founded with the purpose of instructing rural youth in improved farming and farm-homemaking practices. By the 1970s, it was broadening its goals to cover a full range of youth, including minorities,  and a wide range of life experiences.

During this time, researchers at experiment stations of the land-grant universities and USDA saw that adults in the farming community did not readily accept new agricultural discoveries.  However, educators found that youth would experiment with these new ideas and then share their experiences and successes with the adults.  Thus rural youth programs became a way to introduce new agriculture technology to the adults.

Club work began wherever a public-spirited person did something to give rural children respect for themselves and their ways of life and it is very difficult to credit one sole individual. Instances of work with rural boys and girls can be found all throughout the 19th century. In the spring of 1882, Delaware College announced a statewide corn contest for boys, in which each boy was to plant a quarter of an acre, according to instructions sent out from the college, and cash prizes, certificates, and subscriptions to the American Agriculturalist were rewarded.

In 1892, in an effort to improve the Kewaunee County Fair, Ransom Asa Moore, President of the Kewaunee Fair, the Agricultural Society, and Superintendent of the Kewaunee County Schools in Wisconsin, organized a "youth movement", which he called "Young People's Contest Clubs", in which he solicited the support of 6,000 young farm folks to produce and exhibit fruits, vegetables, and livestock. The fairs were very successful. In 1904, while working for the University of Wisconsin–Madison and trying to repeat what he had successfully accomplished in Kewaunee County over a decade before but with different intentions, "Daddy" R.A. Moore convinced R.H. Burns, then Superintendent of Schools of Richland County, Wisconsin, to have the Richland County Boys and Girls organize and assist in a corn-project activity to help market and distribute improved seeds to the farmers in the state of Wisconsin (and beyond).

A. B. Graham started one of the youth programs in Clark County, Ohio, in 1902, which is also considered one of the births of the 4-H program in the United States. The first club was called "The Tomato Club" or the "Corn Growing Club". T.A. "Dad" Erickson of Douglas County, Minnesota, started local agricultural after-school clubs and fairs also in 1902. Jessie Field Shambaugh developed the clover pin with an H on each leaf in 1910, and, by 1912, they were called 4-H clubs. Early 4-H programs in Colorado began with youth instruction offered by college agricultural agents as early as 1910, as part of the outreach mission of the Colorado land grant institutions. The national 4-H organization was formed in 1914, when the United States Congress created the Cooperative Extension Service of the USDA by passage of the Smith-Lever Act of 1914, it included within the CES charter the work of various boys' and girls' clubs involved with agriculture, home economics and related subjects. The Smith-Lever Act formalized the 4-H programs and clubs that began in the midwestern region of the United States.  Although different activities were emphasized for boys and girls, 4-H was one of the first youth organizations to give equal attention to both genders (cf., erstwhile Boys Clubs of America).  The first appearance of the term "4-H Club" in a federal document was in "Organization and Results of Boys' and Girls' Club Work," by Oscar Herman Benson (1875–1951) and Gertrude L. Warren, in 1920.  By 1924, these clubs became organized as 4-H clubs, and the clover emblem was adopted.  Warren expanded the scope of girls' activities under the program (promoting garment making, room decorating, and hot lunches), and wrote extensive training materials.

The first 4-H camp was held in Randolph County, West Virginia. Originally, these camps were for what was referred to as "Corn Clubs". Campers slept in corn fields, in tents, only to wake up and work almost the entirety of each day. Superintendent of schools G. C. Adams began a boys' corn club in Newton County, Georgia, in 1904.

4-H membership hit an all-time high in 1974 as a result of its popular educational program about nutrition, Mulligan Stew, shown in schools and on television across the country.   Today, 4-H clubs and activities are no longer focused primarily on agricultural activities, instead emphasizing personal growth and preparation for lifelong learning.  Participation is greatest during the elementary school years, with enrollment in programs and activities peaking in the 4th grade.

In the southern United States,  in the mid-1960s 4-H began to broaden its programming to cover life experiences unrelated to agriculture. It merged its segregated African
American and white programs, but full-fledged integration proved elusive. 4-H was successful in removing gender-based restrictions on participation.

The organization is funded by the USDA and by state and local governments. The National 4-H Council's programs are also supported by a number of corporations including Google, Verizon, Microsoft, Land O’Lakes Inc., and Tractor Supply Co.

Past Honorary Chairmen of Council have included U.S. Presidents Calvin Coolidge, Herbert Hoover, Franklin D. Roosevelt, Harry Truman, Dwight Eisenhower, John F. Kennedy, Lyndon B. Johnson, Richard Nixon, Jimmy Carter, Ronald Reagan, George H. W. Bush, and Bill Clinton.

Pledge
The 4-H pledge is:

Otis E. Hall wrote the original pledge of Kansas in 1918. Some California 4-H clubs add either "As a true 4-H member" or "As a loyal 4-H member" at the beginning of the pledge. Minnesota and Maine 4-H clubs add "for my family" to the last line of the pledge. Initially, the pledge ended in "and my country".  In 1973, "and my world" was added.

It is a common practice to involve hand motions to accompany these spoken words.  While reciting the first line of the pledge, the speaker will point to their head with both of their hands. As the speaker recites the second line, they will place their right hand over their heart, much like during the Pledge of Allegiance. For the third line, the speaker will present their hands, palm side up, before them. For the fourth line, the speaker will motion to their body down their sides. And for the final line, the speaker will usually place their right hand out for the club, left hand for the community, bring them together for the country, and then bring their hands upwards in a circle for the world.

Emblem

The official 4-H emblem is a green four-leaf clover with a white H on each leaf standing for Head, Heart, Hands, and Health. The stem of the clover always points to the right.

The idea of using the four-leaf clover as an emblem for the 4-H program is credited to Oscar Herman Benson (1875–1951) of Wright County Iowa. He awarded three-leaf and four-leaf clover pennants and pins for students' agricultural and domestic science exhibits at school fairs.

The 4-H name and emblem had U.S. federal protection, previous under federal code 18 U.S.C. 707. This federal protection made it a mark unto and of itself with protection that supersedes the limited authorities of both a trademark and a copyright. The Secretary of Agriculture is given responsibility and stewardship for the 4-H name and emblem, at the direct request of the U.S. Congress. These protections placed the 4-H emblem in a unique category of protected emblems, also along with the U.S. Presidential Seal, Red Cross, Smokey Bear and the Olympic rings. The protections for the 4-H emblem were repealed by Title XI of the Consolidated Appropriations Act, 2021.

Youth development research
Through the program's tie to land-grant institutions of higher education, 4-H academic staff are responsible for advancing the field of youth development.  Professional academic staff are committed to innovation, the creation of new knowledge, and the dissemination of new forms of program practice and research on topics like University of California's study of thriving in young people.  Youth development research is undertaken in a variety of forms including program evaluation, applied research, and introduction of new programs.

Volunteers
Over 540,000 volunteer leaders help to coordinate the 4-H program at the county level. Volunteers plan and conduct 4-H related activities, develop and maintain educational programs, or assist in fundraising. Activities include youth development programs, project groups, camps, conferences, or animal shows. Volunteers' stated goal is to help youth achieve greater self-confidence and self-responsibility, learn new skills, and build relationships.

Volunteers are directed by 4-H's professional staff.

The National 4-H Hall of Fame honors 4-H volunteers, extension professionals and staff employees, donors and others, according to a criterion of "significant impact on the 4-H program and/or 4-H members through the contribution of time, energy, financial resources, etc.". The hall of fame was established in 2002 by the National Association of Extension 4-H Youth Development Professionals (NAE4-HYDP).

Additional programs

After-school

4-H Afterschool helps 4-H and other youth-serving organizations create and improve programs for students in communities across the U.S. 4-H Afterschool is an extension-enhanced program that:
Offers youth a safe, healthy, caring and enriching environment.
Engages youth in long-term, structured learning in partnership with adults.
Addresses the interests of youth and their physical, cognitive, social and emotional needs.
4-H Afterschool programs utilize experimental and cooperative learning activities and provide interaction with competent adults. Results of retrospective pre/post-surveys indicate that children enrolled in the program showed life skill gain over time, and that gains on specific life skills differed as a function of age, gender, and ethnicity.

The life skills gained through 4-H Afterschool give children the tools they need for perceiving and responding to diverse life situations and achieving their personal goals. Participation in these quality programs which use experiential and cooperative learning have all been found to contribute to children's social development and academic success.

Camping

Each state runs its own camping program.  The world’s first 4-H camp was held in July 1915 on the Crouch family farm along the Tygart Valley River near Elkwater, Randolph County, West Virginia.  The youth in attendance named the location “Camp Good Luck.”

The first state 4-H camp was held at Jackson's Mill outside of Weston in Lewis County, West Virginia. 4-H camping programs in most states are run through land-grant institutions, such as Washington State University, which runs the Washington program, and Pennsylvania State University runs Pennsylvania's. The Georgia 4-H camping program has the largest youth center in the world, called Rock Eagle.

On July 8, 2015, to mark the centennial of 4-H camping, youth from Randolph County traveled back to the original Camp Good Luck site for a special commemoration and campfire program.  A stone marker honoring Camp Good Luck had been placed adjacent to US 219 near the site, but was relocated nearby to a spot off of Bell Crouch Rd. for greater safety and accessibility through the efforts of Randolph County 4-H volunteers and the West Virginia Division of Highways.

Five- to eight-year-old youth
Some states offer programs for youth in grades K-3 called Cloverbuds, Cloverkids, 4-H Adventurers, Primary Members, or Mini 4-H. Most states prohibit this age group from competition due to research in child development demonstrating that competition is unhealthy for youth ages five to eight.

Collegiate
Many colleges and universities have collegiate 4-H clubs. Usually members are students who are 4-H alumni and want to continue a connection to 4-H, but any interested students are welcome. Clubs provide service and support to their local and state 4-H programs, such as serving as judges and conducting training workshops. They are also a service and social group for campus students. The very first collegiate 4-H club started in 1916 on the Oklahoma State University - Stillwater campus.

All Stars
Finding its roots in the early 4-H movement in West Virginia, the 4-H All-Star program strives to recognize and challenge 4-H members and volunteers.  State 4-H Club Leader William H. "Teepi" Kendrick sought to develop youth to "be yourself at your best" and to "make the best better" through a fourfold personal development pattern involving the head, hands, heart, and, at that time, hustle.  It was with this philosophy, in collaboration with others, that the 4-H emblem was born. In an attempt to harbor further individual growth, Kendrick recognized excellence with pins bearing one, two, three, and four H's.  Recognition for outstanding participation was rewarded from 1917 to 1921 with trips to a Prize Winner's Course at West Virginia University.  Members who demonstrated outstanding qualities at these courses were awarded five-pointed red pins with five H's, with this additional H to symbolize honor.  The recipients of these pins were referred to by Kendrick as "All Stars". It was following the pin consecration ceremony in 1919 that the official West Virginia 4-H All Stars organization was chartered, becoming the Alpha Chapter of the nationwide 4-H honorary.

The symbol of the All Stars is a red star enveloping a gemstone chip over the 4-H emblem. Each point of the star represents a pillar of character: "Beauty, Fortitude, Service, Truth, and Love".

Many states have All Star programs, although All Star programs vary from state to state. Selection as a 4-H All Star is a recognition of achievement. In California, for example, it is the highest achievement award at the county level and is a position awarded annually. Similarly, the capstone award in Texas 4-H is the Gold Star Award, which is given to Seniors who have shown outstanding leadership and proficiency in their project areas.

In Virginia, on the other hand, All-Stars are not simply those who have achieved an All-Star award, but are those who have gained membership into the Virginia All-Stars organization. Upon reaching the age of 15, 4-H members are eligible to apply for membership into the All-Stars organization, which promotes the continuation of 4-H principles.

Conferences

Many conferences are held at various levels of the 4-H program for youth and adults.  The National 4-H Conference, which was held at the National 4-H Youth Conference Center in Chevy Chase, Maryland, until it was sold in 2021, is the USDA Secretary's premier youth development opportunity to engage youth in developing recommendations for the 4-H Youth Development Program.

The National 4-H Congress is an annual educational conference that brings together 4-H delegates between the ages of 14 and 19 from across America to share cultural experiences and discuss important issues facing youth. This five-day event is typically held during the weekend of Thanksgiving and has been hosted in Atlanta, Georgia, since 1998. Throughout the conference, 4-H delegates attend numerous workshops, participate in community service activities, and listen to speakers in an effort to develop compassion and increase social awareness.

Citizenship Washington Focus is a week-long conference offered for high school-aged students. At the conference, students have the opportunity to learn how to be citizen leaders in their communities. Throughout the week in Washington, D.C., participants visit monuments, meet with members of Congress, and develop communication, leadership and citizenship skills.

The following national conferences are held yearly, and are focused on specific activities inside of 4-H:

 National 4-H Dairy Conference
 Eastern National 4-H Horse Roundup
 Western National 4-H Horse Roundup
 National 4-H Shooting Sports Invitational Match
National 4-H True Leaders in Equity Institute
National 4-H Youth Summit Series
STEM Summit
Healthy Living Summit
Agri-science Summit
Other conferences are held by regional and state entities for youth, for volunteer development, or for professional development for staff.

Controversy

Native Americans
For many years, use of Native American names and certain themed activities was part of the summer camping programs of some eastern states. However, this practice was deemed offensive and protests were raised.  A complaint to the U.S. Department of Agriculture's Office of Civil Rights in 2002 and an ensuing investigation that threatened to cut off funds to the state's program prompted the West Virginia University Extension Service to abandon offensive and stereotypic practices such as face-painting, and use of imagery not a part of the culture of local Native people, such as tepees and totem poles, They also eliminated the practice of having children wear feather headdresses, and stopped having campers engage in "stereotypical motions and dances," including chanting "Ugh! Ugh! Ugh!".  However, the state program deemed the dividing of campers into groups, called "tribes" named after actual Indian Nations, to be respectful and acceptable. That same year, the Virginia Extension Service removed all references to symbols or camp "traditions" related to Native Americans, including the decades-long practice of dividing campers into "tribes" using names of nations considered native to Virginia, replacing the group names with animal names.

Alumni

Some 4-H alumni credit the program with helping them in later life.

See also
4-H Shooting Sports Programs
Boy Scouts of America
Girl Scouts of the USA
International Four-H Youth Exchange
National Federation of Young Farmers' Clubs
National FFA Organization (formerly Future Farmers of America)
Rural Youth Europe

References

Bibliography
 
 
 Holt, Marilyn Irvin. Linoleum, Better Babies, and the Modern Farm Woman, 1890-1930 (U of New Mexico Press, 1995).
 
 Rosenberg, Gabriel N. The 4-H Harvest: Sexuality and the State in Rural America (University of Pennsylvania Press, 2015)
 Thompson, Ellen Natasha. " The Changing Needs of Our Youth Today: The Response of 4-H to Social and Economic Transformations in Twentieth-century North Carolina." (PhD Diss. University of North Carolina at Greensboro, 2012). online
 Wessel, Thomas R. and Marilyn Wessel. 4-H: An American Idea, 1900-1980: A History of 4-H (Chevy Chase, MD: 4-H National Council, 1982).

External links

 4-H Website Official website for more information about 4-H on all levels of the 4-H system
Index of National 4-H Hall of Fame
 4-H Canada

 
Organizations established in 1927
1927 establishments in the United States
Youth development organizations
Learning programs
United States Department of Agriculture
Life skills
Youth organizations based in Maryland